Aiman Napoli (born 2 July 1989) is an Italian footballer. He plays as a forward for A.C.D. Sant'Angelo 1907.

Club career

Pro Sesto
Born in Paderno Dugnano, in the province of Milan, Napoli started his career at Pro Sesto of Serie C1.

Internazionale
He was signed by  Internazionale Primavera in a co-ownership deal in January 2007, for a fee of about €70,000 (in part-player swap: Marco Dalla Costa and Daniele Federici), but was loaned back to Pro Sesto for the second half of the 2006–2007 season. He officially became a player of the Nerazzurri Primavera on 1 July 2007.

He made his first team debut against Reggina Calcio on 19 December 2007. That Coppa Italia match Inter beat Reggina 4–1 and Napoli replaced Hernán Crespo just 1 minute before the 4th goal by Mario Balotelli in the 86th minute. Napoli wore no.46 (of 1st team) in the 2007–08 season. The Primavera League regular season team top-scorer in both 2007–08 and 2008–09 season, Napoli was purchased outright by Inter on 30 January 2009.

In July 2009, along with Primavera team-mate Cristian Daminuţă and Enrico Alfonso, they were loaned to Serie B side Modena. He was awarded a no.11 shirt. He made 23 league appearances, started 12 times for the team which finished in mid-table.

In the 2010–11 season he left for F.C. Crotone along with Vid Belec.

Prato
In July 2011 he was sold to Serie B newcomer Juve Stabia on a co-ownership deal, joining former teammate Cristiano Biraghi. However, on 31 August he returned to Inter without any appearances with Juve Stabia. In January 2012 he joined Prato on loan in Lega Pro Prima Divisione and he scored the decisive goal in the play-off against Piacenza. In July 2012 Prato finally signed him permanently.

Pisa 
In July 2013 he signed a two years contract with A.C. Pisa 1909.

Renate
In 2015 Napoli was signed by Renate.

Reggiana
On 22 August 2017 Napoli was signed by Reggiana.

Sant'Angelo
On 26 October 2019 A.C.D. Sant'Angelo 1907 confirmed, that they had signed Napoli.

References

External links
 
 
 
 Profile at AIC.Football.it  

Italian footballers
S.S.D. Pro Sesto players
Inter Milan players
Modena F.C. players
F.C. Crotone players
Hellas Verona F.C. players
A.C. Prato players
Pisa S.C. players
Calcio Lecco 1912 players
Serie B players
Serie C players
Serie D players
Association football forwards
Sportspeople from the Metropolitan City of Milan
1989 births
Living people
A.C.D. Sant'Angelo 1907 players
Footballers from Lombardy